Leslie Allen may refer to:

Leslie Allen (cricketer) (born 1954), Australian cricketer
Leslie Allen (racing driver) (1904–1977), American racecar driver
Leslie Allen (tennis) (born 1957), retired American professional tennis player
Leslie "Bull" Allen (1916–1982), Australian soldier, recipient of the United States’ Silver Star
Leslie C. Allen, Old Testament scholar at Fuller Theological Seminary and Biblical commentator
Leslie Holdsworth Allen (1879–1964), Australian academic and poet

See also
Leslie Allen Bellrichard (1941–1967), Medal of Honor recipient
Allen (surname)